Brinzio is a comune (municipality) in the Province of Varese in the Italian region Lombardy, located about  northwest of Milan and about  northwest of Varese.

Brinzio borders the following municipalities: Bedero Valcuvia, Castello Cabiaglio, Induno Olona, Rancio Valcuvia, Valganna, Varese.

Demographic evolution

International relations

Twin towns – Sister cities 
Brinzio is twinned with:
  Chaux, France (2013).

References

External links
 www.comune.brinzio.va.it

Cities and towns in Lombardy